Crossair Ltd. Co. for Regional European Air Transport was a regional airline headquartered on the grounds of EuroAirport Basel Mulhouse Freiburg in Saint-Louis, Haut-Rhin, France, near Basel, Switzerland. 

After taking over most of the assets of Swissair following that airline's bankruptcy in 2002, Crossair was restructured to become Swiss International Air Lines.

History
The airline was founded as a private company under the name Business Flyers Basel AG in 1975 by Moritz Suter. The name later changed to Crossair on November 18, 1978, before the beginning of scheduled services on July 2, 1979, with flights from Zürich to Nuremberg, Innsbruck and Klagenfurt. It was headquartered at Zurich International Airport in Kloten in 1985. 

It added charter services for major shareholder Swissair in November 1995.

After parent company SAirGroup had to apply for a debt restructuring moratorium in October 2001, it became necessary to change the entire planning. On 31 March 2002, Swissair ceased all operations while most of its assets were taken over by Crossair which then was subsequently restructured and rebranded to become Swiss International Air Lines.

Head office
Crossair was headquartered on the grounds of EuroAirport Basel-Mulhouse-Freiburg in Saint-Louis, Haut-Rhin, France, near Basel, Switzerland. In 2002 the name "Crossair" was replaced with "Swiss International Air Lines" on the head office building.

Destinations
Crossair flew from Basel, Bern, Geneva, Lugano and Zurich. Crossair was very interested in serving from several hubs and, therefore set up a multi-hub business plan. Crossair set up a Eurocross scheme from their Basel base to serve smaller airports and transfer their passengers to larger hubs with short transit times (only around 20 minutes) This helped Crossair link with partners, such as Swissair from Zurich. Crossair also operated flights between Swiss airports.

Fleet

Crossair operated the following aircraft:

Accidents and incidents
On 10 January 2000, Crossair Flight 498 crashed just after take-off from Zürich.  All 10 people aboard were killed.

On 24 November 2001, Crossair Flight 3597 crashed near Zürich, killing 24 of 33 people aboard, including the former La Bouche lead singer Melanie Thornton and two of the three members of the German Eurodance group Passion Fruit. The third member, Debby St. Maarten, sustained serious injuries but survived.

On 10 July 2002, Crossair Flight 850 made an emergency landing at Werneuchen Airfield in Germany. The aircraft was damaged beyond repair when it hit an earth bank placed across the runway, the markings of which did not conform to standards.

See also
Crossair Europe
Swissair

References

External links

Crossair Website - crossair.com (Archive)
Crossair Website - crossair.ch (Archive) 
Crossair Website - crossair.ch (Archive)

Defunct airlines of Switzerland
Airlines established in 1975
Airlines disestablished in 2002
Companies based in Basel
Swissair
Swiss companies established in 1975
Swiss companies disestablished in 2002